A301 may refer to:

 A301 road (Great Britain), a road in London, England
 SAS Drakensberg (A301), a ship